Nabiyevo (Näbi) is a rural locality (a village) in Staromunasipovsky Selsoviet, Burzyansky District, Bashkortostan, Russia. The population was 472 as of 2010. There are 8 streets.

Geography 
Nabiyevo is located 28 km northeast of Starosubkhangulovo (the district's administrative centre) by road. Kurgashly is the nearest rural locality.

References 

Rural localities in Burzyansky District